Herodotus divided the Achaemenid Empire into 20 districts for the purpose of tribute payments. The following is a description of the ethnic makeup of the districts and the amount they paid in taxes, translated from Herodotus' Histories.

Accounting units
The quantities of silver are given in Babylonian talent (1 Babylonian talent = about 30.3 kg), while the quantities of gold (India only) are given in Euboïc/Euboean talent (1 Euboïc talent = about 26 kg). Only the Hindush paid in gold, the exchange rate of gold to silver being 1 to 13 by weight at the time of Herodotus.

Tax districts
The order of the districts given here follows Herodotus, Histories, III.90–94. In hellenocentric way it starts with Ionia and Mysia. The official Persian order of the provinces, as devised under Darius I in 518 BCE, was different and started from the Empire's capital: 1. Media, 2. Susa, etc. For comparison, it is given in the rightmost column.

See also 

 Achaemenid conquest of the Indus Valley
 Achaemenid Empire
 Satrapies

Citations

General references 
 Darius: List of Satrapies

 
Herodotus